The 2005 All-Ireland Minor Football Championship was the 74th staging of the All-Ireland Minor Football Championship, the Gaelic Athletic Association's premier inter-county Gaelic football tournament for boys under the age of 18.

Tyrone entered the championship as defending champions, however, they were defeated by Down in the Ulster quarter-final.

On 25 September 2005, Down won the championship following a 1-15 to 0-8 defeat of Mayo in the All-Ireland final. This was their fourth All-Ireland title overall and their first title in six championship seasons.

Results

Connacht Minor Football Championship

Rob Robin

Semi-Finals

Final

Leinster Minor Football Championship

Rob Robin

	
	
	
	
	
	
	
	
	
	
	
	
	
	
	
	

Semi-Final

Final

Munster Minor Football Championship

Rob Robin

Semi-Finals

Final

Ulster Minor Football Championship

Rob Robin

Semi-Finals

Final

All-Ireland Minor Football Championship

Quarter-Finals

Semi-Finals

Final

Championship statistics

Miscellaneous

 Down become the second team to win the All-Ireland title via the "back door". They had earlier been defeated by Armagh in the Ulster final.

References

2005
All-Ireland Minor Football Championship